Guatemala's major diplomatic interests are regional security and increasingly, regional development and economic integration.

Diplomatic relations

Bilateral relations

Multilateral relations 
The Central American Ministers of Trade meet on a regular basis to work on regional approaches to trade issues. In March 1998, Guatemala joined its Central American neighbors in signing a Trade and Investment Framework Agreement (TIFA). In 2000 it joined Honduras and El Salvador in signing a free trade agreement with Mexico, which went into effect in 2001. Guatemala also originated the idea for, and is the seat of, the Central American Parliament (PARLACEN).

Guatemala participates in several regional groups, particularly those related to the environment and trade. For example, US President Clinton and the Central American presidents signed the CONCAUSA (Conjunto Centroamerica-USA) agreement at the Summit of the Americas in December 1994. CONCAUSA is a cooperative plan of action to promote clean, efficient energy use; conserve the region's biodiversity; strengthen legal and institutional frameworks and compliance mechanisms; and improve and harmonize environmental protection standards.

Illicit drugs:
Guatemala is a transit country for cocaine shipments; minor producer of illicit opium poppy and cannabis for the international drug trade; active eradication program in 1996 effectively eliminated the cannabis crop; proximity to Mexico makes Guatemala a major staging area for drugs (cocaine shipments).

See also

 Belizean–Guatemalan territorial dispute
 List of diplomatic missions in Guatemala
 List of diplomatic missions of Guatemala
 Visa requirements for Guatemalan citizens

References

External links
Ministry of Foreign Affairs of Guatemala
Legal Opinion on Guatemala's Territorial Claim to Belize and MFA Library and GAR and Other Documents and Summary of Legal Opinion of 25 November 2008
Belize/Guatemala ICJ Compromis Signed at OAS in Washington, D.C. on 8 December 2008 and Compromis and Videos and  U.S. Congratulations and U.K. Congratulations and Photographs and Compromis for Christmas of 8 December 2008 and Belize Leading Counsel of 19 December 2008